"When I Find Love Again" is a song recorded by British singer-songwriter James Blunt. It was released on 16 September 2014, as the lead single from the Apollo Edition of his fourth studio album Moon Landing (2013). The song was written by Steve Mac, Benjamin Levin, Ammar Malik, Daniel Omelio, Ross Golan and Charlotte Aitchison.

Track listing

Charts

Weekly charts

Year-end charts

Release history

References

2014 singles
2014 songs
James Blunt songs
Atlantic Records singles
Songs written by Benny Blanco
Songs written by Steve Mac
Songs written by Ammar Malik
Songs written by Ross Golan
Songs written by Charli XCX
Songs written by Robopop